Jamini Majumdar Memorial College is a college at Patiram in the Dakshin Dinajpur district of West Bengal, India. The college is affiliated to University of Gour Banga,  offering undergraduate courses. Its commencement as an institute has been started in 2008 on 11 August.

Departments

 Bengali (HONOURS)
 English (HONOURS)
 Sanskrit (HONOURS)
 History (HONOURS)
 Arabic (GENERAL)
 Political Science (GENERAL)
 Philosophy (GENERAL)
 Geography (GENERAL)
 Education (GENERAL)
 Sociology (GENERAL)
 Physical Education (GENERAL)

See also

References

External links
http://www.jmmcollegepatiram.org
University of Gour Banga
University Grants Commission
National Assessment and Accreditation Council

Colleges affiliated to University of Gour Banga
Educational institutions established in 2008
Universities and colleges in Dakshin Dinajpur district
2008 establishments in West Bengal